The Fourth Periodic Review of Westminster constituencies was undertaken in the United Kingdom between 1991 and 1995 by the four Boundary Commissions. As well as changes to constituency boundaries, the Reviews recommended an increase of five seats in England (524 to 529), two in Wales (38 to 40) and one in Northern Ireland (17 to 18), with Scotland continuing to have 72 seats. The number of MPs in the House of Commons therefore increased from 651 to 659. 144 new constituencies were created, offset by 136 which were abolished. The new boundaries were first used for the 1997 general election.

Review process
Under the terms of the Parliamentary Constituencies Act 1986, as enacted, the Boundary Commissions were required to present their final recommendations between 10 and 15 years after the submission of their previous reports. As the final reports for the Third Periodic Review had been submitted between October 1982 and February 1983, the final reports for the Fourth Review were due to be submitted no later than February 1998. Accordingly, the English Commission had commenced their review in February 1991 and the Scottish Commission had commenced theirs in February 1992. In the meantime, reflecting concerns that the period between reviews was too long, the Government proposed that the gap between reviews should be reduced to between 8 and 12 years and that the deadline for the Fourth Review should be brought forward to 31 December 1994. This was legislated through the Boundary Commissions Act 1992.

The final reports were submitted as follows:

 Scotland - 15 December 1994

 Wales - 16 December 1994
 England - 12 April 1995
 Northern Ireland - 20 June 1995

Changes 
As a result of changes to the names of seats, it is not always easy to clearly identify newly created constituencies or those abolished during the review process. One way of considering this is to link each proposed seat with an existing seat which contributes the most voters to that new seat. Any proposed seat which cannot be linked to an existing seat is then considered to be a "new" constituency. Conversely, any existing seat which is not linked to a proposed seat is considered to have been abolished.

The tables below list the names of existing seats which were not replicated in the final proposals for the fourth review ("old seats"), and links them with proposed seats which did not exist prior to the review ("new seats"). Those seats which are not linked can be regarded as being genuinely abolished or newly created. There are a number of instances where existing seats are effectively abolished and re-created under the same name, as set out in the notes.

England 
The number of seats in England increased by five. 19 non-metropolitan counties gained one seat each, with Hampshire gaining two. This was offset by a reduction of ten seats in Greater London, two each in Greater Manchester and West Midlands, and one each in Lancashire and Merseyside.

In Greater London, the Commission, for the first time, decided to pair some London Boroughs together to reduce the variation in the size of electorates. These are detailed in the table below.

Wales 
The number of seats in Wales was increased from 38 to 40 through the creation of an additional seat in the counties of Clwyd and Dyfed.

Scotland 
The number of seats in Scotland remained at 72, with an additional seat in Grampian region being offset by the loss of a seat in the City of Glasgow in Strathclyde region.

Northern Ireland 
The number of seats in Northern Ireland was increased from 17 to 18 through the creation of West Tyrone. This comprised the majority of the existing Mid Ulster seat, which was reconfigured and effectively formed a new constituency.

References

Periodic Reviews of Westminster constituencies
1990s in the United Kingdom